A health or medical library is designed to assist physicians, health professionals, students, patients, consumers, medical researchers, and information specialists in finding health and scientific information to improve, update, assess, or evaluate health care.

US & world medical library links

Alabama
University of Alabama/Birmingham
University of South Alabama

Alaska
Health Sciences Information Service, University of Alaska Anchorage

Arizona
Arizona Health Information Network
University of Arizona

Arkansas
Arkansas Area Health Education Centers(AHECs)
University of Arkansas for Medical Sciences

California
SAGE Medical Library (Santa Barbara Cottage Hospital)
California Pacific Medical Center/Univ Pacific School Of Dentistry (San Francisco)
Cedars-Sinai Medical Center (West Hollywood)
Drew University Of Medicine and Science
Loma Linda University
Lane Medical Library
Stanford Hospital Health Library
St. John's Regional Medical Center (Oxnard)
St. Joseph Hospital (Orange)
University Of California/Berkeley Optometry Library
University Of California/Berkeley Public Health Library
University Of California/Davis
University Of California, Irvine, Grunigen Medical Library
University Of California/Los Angeles
University Of California/San Diego
University Of California/San Francisco
 UCSF Mount Zion Medical Center
University Of Southern California
USC Wilson Dental Library
USC Gerontology Center Library
Medical Library Group Of Southern California & Arizona

Colorado
AORN Library (Denver)
University of Colorado Denver

Connecticut
Hartford Hospital
University of Connecticut Health Center
Yale University, Cushing/Whitney Medical Library

Delaware
Delaware Academy of Medicine

District Of Columbia
Catholic University of America - Nursing/Biology Library
George Washington University
Georgetown University Medical Center
Howard University
Pan American Health Organization

Florida
Florida International University
Florida State University
Nova Southeastern University Health Professions Division Library (Fort Lauderdale)
University of Central Florida
University of Florida/Gainesville
University of Miami
University of South Florida

Georgia 
Eisenhower Army Medical Center/SE Regional Medical Command (Fort Gordon)
Emory University
Georgia Health Sciences Library Association
Mercer University
Philadelphia College of Osteopathic Medicine - Georgia Campus

Hawaii 
Hawaii Medical Library
University of Hawaii (Manoa)

Idaho 
Idaho Health Sciences Library

Illinois 
American Dental Association
Health Science Librarians of Illinois
Loyola University
Northwestern University
OSF Saint Francis Medical Center (Peoria)
Rosalind Franklin University (Chicago)
Rush University (Chicago)
Southern Illinois University
University of Chicago
University of Illinois/Chicago
University of Illinois/Peoria
University of Illinois/Rockford
University of Illinois/Urbana

Indiana 
Indiana University Medical Library
Indiana University Dentistry Library
Purdue University (Pharmacy, Nursing, Health Sciences)

Iowa 
Des Moines University
University of Iowa Health Sciences Library
University of Iowa Ophthalmology Library

Kansas 
University Of Kansas (Kansas City)
University of Kansas (Wichita)

Kentucky 
University of Kentucky
University of Louisville

Louisiana 
Ochsner Clinic Foundation (New Orleans)
Louisiana State University Health Sciences Center/New Orleans
Louisiana State University/Shreveport
Tulane University Medical Library

Maine 
Health Science Libraries and Information Consortium of Maine
Maine Medical Center

Maryland 
Johns Hopkins University
NIH Library
University of Maryland/Baltimore

Massachusetts 
Harvard Medical Web
Countway Library of Medicine
Massachusetts General Hospital
New England College of Optometry
South Coast Health System (New Bedford)
Tufts University
University of Massachusetts

Michigan 
Botsford General Hospital (Farmington Hills)
Henry Ford Health System (Detroit)
Providence Hospital (Southfield)
Synergy Medical Education Alliance (Saginaw)
University of Michigan
Wayne State University
Metropolitan Detroit Medical Library Group

Minnesota 
Allina Health System (Minneapolis)
Mayo Clinic (Rochester)
University of Minnesota

Mississippi 
University of Mississippi

Missouri 
Kirksville College of Osteopathic Medicine
Saint Louis University
University of Missouri
University of Missouri/Kansas City
Washington University

Nebraska 
 University of Nebraska
 Creighton University

Nevada 
University of Nevada

New Hampshire 
Dartmouth

New Jersey 
Medical Center at Princeton
Monmouth Medical Center (Long Branch)
St. Peters Medical Center (New Brunswick)
 University of Medicine and Dentistry of New Jersey

New York 
Albany Medical College
Albert Einstein College of Medicine
Columbia University
Columbia University Health Sciences Library
Cornell University
Kaleida Health Libraries (Buffalo)
Mount Sinai
New York Academy of Medicine
New York Dept of Health (Albany)
New York Medical College
New York Methodist Hospital (Brooklyn)
New York University
Rockefeller University
St. Luke's Cornwall Hospital (Newburgh)
State University of New York/Buffalo
State University of New York/New York (College of Optometry Vision Science Library)
State University of New York/Stony Brook
State University of New York/Upstate-Syracuse
University of Rochester
Winthrop University Hospital (Mineola)

North Carolina 
Duke University
East Carolina University
National Institute of Environmental Health Sciences (NIH)
University of North Carolina
Wake Forest University

North Dakota 
 University of North Dakota

Ohio 
 Cleveland Health Sciences Library, Case Western Reserve
Northeast Ohio Medical University
Ohio State University
University of Cincinnati

Oklahoma 
 University of Oklahoma

Oregon 
Oregon Health Sciences University
Samaritan Health

Pennsylvania 
 Drexel University (Philadelphia)
 Easton Hospital
 Fox Chase Cancer Center (Philadelphia)
 Pennsylvania State University (Hershey Medical Center)
 Thomas Jefferson University
 University of Pennsylvania
University of Pittsburgh Health Sciences Library System

South Carolina 
Medical University of South Carolina
 University of South Carolina

South Dakota 
University of South Dakota

Tennessee 
East Tennessee State University
St. Jude Children’s Research Hospital (Memphis)
University of Tennessee Medical Center, Knoxville
University of Tennessee, Memphis
Vanderbilt University (library)

Texas 
Baylor Health Sciences Library
Houston Academy of Medicine-Texas Medical Center
Texas A&M University
 Texas Dept of State Health Services (Austin)
Texas Tech University Health Sciences Center
University of North Texas Health Sciences Center
University of Texas Health Center at San Antonio
University of Texas Health Center, Tyler
University of Texas M.D. Anderson Cancer Center, Research Medical Library
University of Texas Medical Branch, Galveston
University of Texas Southwestern Medical Center

Utah 
University of Utah

Vermont 
 University of Vermont

Virginia 
Appalachian College of Pharmacy
Eastern Virginia
University of Virginia
Virginia Commonwealth

Washington 
Overlake Hospital (Bellevue)
University of Washington Health Sciences Library
 University of Washington Dept of Environmental Health
Washington Medical Librarians Association

West Virginia 
 Marshall University
West Virginia University, Charleston Division

Wisconsin 
Medical College of Wisconsin
 St. Joseph Hospital/covenant Library System, Milwaukee
 University of Wisconsin

US Territories 
University of Puerto Rico

Australia 
Canberra Hospital
 Flinders University/Medical Library (South Australia)
Monash University/Biomedical Library (Victoria)
Royal Victorian Eye and Ear Hospital/Royal Australian College of Ophthalmologists
University of Melbourne-Biomedical Library
University of New South Wales/Biomedical Library
University of Queensland/Biological & Health Sciences Libraries
University of Sydney
Women's and Children Health (Melbourne)

Canada 
Dalhousie University (Halifax, Nova Scotia)
Health Science Information Consortium of Toronto
McGill University
McMaster University
 Memorial University of Newfoundland
 University of Alberta
University of British Columbia
Children's/Women's Hospitals
University of Calgary
University of Manitoba
 University of Montreal
 CHU Sainte-Justine
 University of Ottawa
University of Saskatchewan
University of Toronto
University of Western Ontario

Germany
Medizinische Bibliothek der Charité - Universitätsmedizin Berlin
German National Library of Medicine, Koeln
Universitaats- und Landesbibliothek, Muenster, Zweigbibliothek der Medizin
Saarlaandische Universitaats-und Landesbibliothek-Medizinische Abteilung, Homburg/Saar
Universitaat Magdeburg, Medizinische Zentralbibliothek

India

  All India Institute of Medical Sciences (AIIMS), Patna, Bihar

United Kingdom 
Bedford Hospitals NHS Trust
British Medical Association
Cardiff University
Health Libraries Group
National Health Service (London)
 Royal College of Nursing
 South West Health Care
 Hope Hospital / University of Manchester

Other countries  
American University of Antigua (West Indies)
 Medical University of Sofia Central Medical Library (Bulgaria)
Chinese University of Hong Kong (China)
 Zagreb University (Croatia)
 TerKko – National Library of Health Sciences (Finland)
 Helsinki University – Dental Library
 List of French Medical libraries, from Rouen University Hospital Medical Library
SBC institute (Athens, Greece)
National University of Ireland, Galway
Hebrew University (Israel)
Kuwait University
Kuala Lumpur Hospital (Malaysia)
 Academic Hospital Groningen (The Netherlands)
Hospital de Cruces (Bilbao, Spain)
Karolinska Institutet University Library (Stockholm, Sweden)
Hospital Ramon y Cajal Biblioteca (Madrid)
University of the West Indies, St Augustine (Trinidad)
Rashid medical library (United Arab Emirates)

Libraries
medical libraries